Rojas Partido is a partido in the north of Buenos Aires Province in Argentina.

Settlements

Rojas
Carabelas
Rafael Obligado
Roberto Cano
Los Indios
La Beba
Guido Spano
Hunter
Rafael Obligado
Sol de Mayo

External links
 Municipal Site (Spanish)
 Rojas Partido (Spanish)

1777 establishments in South America
Partidos of Buenos Aires Province